Palpifer sexnotatus is a moth of the family Hepialidae. It is found in India and Japan. Food plants for the species include Amorphophallus and Colocasia.

References

Moths described in 1879
Hepialidae
Moths of Japan